José García Pérez (born 3 December 1921 Date of death 8 December 2001) was an Argentine footballer. He played in six matches for the Argentina national football team from 1951 to 1956. He was also part of Argentina's squad for the 1956 South American Championship.

References

External links
 

1921 births
Possibly living people
Argentine footballers
Argentina international footballers
Place of birth missing (living people)
Association football defenders
Racing Club de Avellaneda footballers
Club Atlético Tigre footballers
Argentine football managers
Racing Club de Avellaneda managers